Rahima Gambo (born 1986) is a Nigerian multimedia artist based in Abuja, Nigeria.

Early life and career 
Gambo graduated from The University of Manchester in 2007 with a Bachelor's degree in Development Studies. In 2008 she received a Master's in Gender and Social Policy from London School of Economics. In 2014 she received another Master's in Journalism from Columbia Graduate School of Journalism. Later in 2014 she started a fellowship at Magnum Foundation

Work 

Rahima Gambo is a multimedia artist who came to artistic practice from photojournalism and by working independently on trans-media documentary projects.  Tatsuniya 2017 - ongoing) a photography and film series takes place at Shehu Sanda Kyarimi school, Maiduguri,  Nigeria extends a collaboration with current students of the school who perform in the  series. We see the students moving from the classroom to dense green forest in a dream like sequence, expanding on the social surrealist language the artist developed in 2017 in Tatsuinya I. Tatsuniya II continues on an intuitive and improvisational vein using children’s games, poetry and exercises from a Physical Education book for secondary school students as a framework for weaving the narrative together. The choreographed moving sequences are seen in the film are developed during storytelling workshops.

Her wider work engages with the tools of documentary making and an expanded visual language that includes drawing, film, sculpture, installation and sound.

Selected group exhibitions include Have you seen a Horizon Lately? MACAAL, Morocco. The 11th and 12th Edition Recontre de Bamako, the Biennale of African photography, Mali. “Resisting Images, Images Responding” at Coalmine, Winterthur, Switzerland. “Beyond the Image, Bertien van Manen and Friends” Stedelijk Museum, Amsterdam, Mercosur Biennial, 12th edition—Feminine(s): visualities, actions and affections, “Afterglow” Yokohama Triennale 2020, Lagos Biennale 2019. “Diaspora at Home” curated by KADIST and the Centre for Contemporary Art in Lagos, Nigeria.

In 2019, Gambo founded A Walk Space her studio and also a conceptual mobile art space that explores the interdisciplinary intersections of the “moving” image through collaborations, exhibitions and workshops. 

Her latest work Instruments of Air shot in Burkina Faso . Every morning she set out and explored the area, smartphone camera in hand, the crunchy red ground under her soles, the lush green of the trees in front of her, and above her the blue sky, filled with the song of the birds . Sound, says Gambo, was very central to her in those first few days, as she didn't speak French or any of the local idioms. Instead of words, she perceived intonations, timbres and voices. The ephemeral took the place of supposedly secured knowledge. What interested her was the experience of immersing oneself in the environment with one's own body and letting things seep into you: the landscape, the sound, the wind and the warmth of the sun on your skin, but also the memory of the traces that other life has left here. In her video, Gambo holds small brass sculptures in front of the camera, which she calls "Walk Maps". Between point-like ends they form semicircles, triangles, angles or serpentine lines. They look like prehistoric objects, undecided between work of art and everyday object, figurine or navigation device.

References

External links 

Nigerian photographers
1986 births
Living people